Thomas Foley (c. 1670 – 10 December 1737), of Stoke Edith Court, Herefordshire, was a British landowner and Tory politician who sat in the English and British House of Commons between 1691 and 1737. He held the sinecure office of auditor of the imprests.

Foley was the eldest son of Paul Foley, House of Commons of England and ironmaster, and succeeded to his estates around Stoke Edith, Herefordshire on his father's death in 1699.

Foley was Member of Parliament for Weobley from 1691 to 1698 and from 1699 to 1700. He was then MP for Hereford from 1701 to 1722. He was subsequently MP for Stafford from 1722 to 1727 and again from 1734 until his death. Throughout this period, he was the leading ironmaster in the Forest of Dean.  Initially this business was managed by John Wheeler and then by William Rea, until Rea was sacked in 1725.  From that time the number of ironworks operated by his business, latterly without outside partners gradually declined.

Foley and his wife Anne, daughter and heir of Essex Knightley of Fawsley, Northamptonshire had one son Thomas Foley, and two daughters, Anne and Mary.

References

Burke's Peerage

1670 births
1737 deaths
English ironmasters
Members of the Parliament of Great Britain for Stafford
People from Herefordshire
English MPs 1690–1695
English MPs 1695–1698
English MPs 1698–1700
English MPs 1701
English MPs 1701–1702
English MPs 1702–1705
English MPs 1705–1707
British MPs 1707–1708
British MPs 1708–1710
British MPs 1710–1713
British MPs 1713–1715
British MPs 1715–1722
British MPs 1722–1727
British MPs 1734–1741
Thomas